Marivirga sericea is a bacterium from the genus of Marivirga which has been isolated from marine aquarium outflow in the United States.

References

External links
Type strain of Marivirga sericea at BacDive -  the Bacterial Diversity Metadatabase	

Cytophagia
Bacteria described in 1969